Wagstaff is an unincorporated community in Miami County, Kansas, United States.  It is part of the Kansas City metropolitan area.

History
A post office was opened in Wagstaff in 1888, and remained in operation until it was discontinued in 1933.

In 2022 two tornadoes appeared near Wagstaff.

References

Further reading

External links
 Miami County maps: Current, Historic, KDOT

Unincorporated communities in Miami County, Kansas
Unincorporated communities in Kansas